Pondok Kopi is a village (kelurahan) of Duren Sawit, East Jakarta, Indonesia.

East Jakarta
Villages of Duren Sawit